Zecca, Italian for "mint", may refer to:

People
 Adriano Zecca (1923–1983). Italian professional football player and coach
 Alfredo Zecca (1949–2022), prelate of the Roman Catholic Church, former archbishop of Tucumán 
 Ferdinand Zecca (1864-1947), French film director

Other
 Papal mint, located in Vatican City
 Istituto Poligrafico e Zecca dello Stato, the mint of the Italian Republic
 Zecca of Venice

See also
List of mints